KRI Teluk Jakarta (541) was a  operated the Indonesian Navy. The ship was former Eisenhüttenstadt (615) of the Volksmarine.

Characteristics
KRI Teluk Jakarta is a Project 108 (NATO reporting name: Frosch I) regular medium landing ship.

The ship is powered by two diesel engines, with total power output of  distributed in two shaft.

As Eisenhüttenstadt, she was initially armed with two  twin 57 mm guns, two AK-230 twin barrel 30 mm guns and equipped with Muff Cob fire control radar. She may have been equipped with two 40-tube 122 mm rocket launchers. As Teluk Jakarta, the ship are rearmed with one single Bofors 40 mm L/60 gun, one twin V-11 37 mm L/63 guns, and two twin 2М-3 25 mm autocannons.

Service history
Eisenhüttenstadt was built by VEB Peenewerft, Wolgast. The ship was laid down on 18 August 1977, launched on 8 March 1978 and was commissioned to Volksmarine on 4 January 1979. Following the reunification of Germany, Eisenhüttenstadt was deleted on 1 October 1990 and was formally decommissioned from Volksmarine on 2 October. The unified German Navy didn't take over the ship and she was laid up with her pennant number painted over at Peenemünde Naval Base, awaiting her disposal as scrap metal.

Indonesian Navy acquired the ship on 25 August 1993 as part of warship procurement program headed by the then State Minister for Research and Technology, B. J. Habibie, as the Coordinator of the Procurement Team. The procurement program was based on the Presidential Instruction No. 3/1992 issued by President Suharto on 3 September 1992 which aimed to bolster the Navy capabilities. Prior to sailing for Indonesia, she was refitted and demilitarized in Germany. The ship arrived in Indonesia in 1994 and she was commissioned as KRI Teluk Jakarta (541) on 19 September 1994.

Teluk Jakarta was sunk due to leakage after being hit by high waves on 14 July 2020 at 09:00 UTC+7 in the waters northeast of Kangean Island. She sank at the depth of 90 meters while carrying logistics bound for eastern Indonesia. The waves in the area were rising up from 2.5 to 4 meters high. All 55 crew members survived the sinking. 54 were rescued by KM Tanto Sejahtera and the last one by KM Dobonsolo. According to the Head of the Navy Information Service, Rear Admiral M. Zaenal, at the time of the sinking, the ship was seaworthy and was routinely maintained.

References

Bibliography

 

1978 ships
Frosch-class landing ships
Amphibious warfare vessels of the Indonesian Navy
Maritime incidents in 2020